Snake is a sub-genre of action video games where the player maneuvers the end of a growing line, often themed as a snake. The player must keep the snake from colliding with both other obstacles and itself, which gets harder as the snake lengthens. It originated in the 1976 two-player arcade video game Blockade from Gremlin Industries where the goal is to survive longer than the other player. The concept evolved into a single-player variant where a snake gets longer with each piece of food eaten—often apples or eggs. The simplicity and low technical requirements of snake games have resulted in hundreds of versions—some of which have the word snake or worm in the title—for many platforms.

1982's Tron arcade game, based on the film, includes snake gameplay for the single-player Light Cycle segment, and some later snake games borrow the theme. After a version simply called  Snake was preloaded on Nokia mobile phones in 1998, there was a resurgence of interest in snake games as it found a larger audience.

Gameplay
The original Blockade from 1976 and its many clones are two-player games. Viewed from a top-down perspective, each player controls a "snake" with a fixed starting position. The "head" of the snake continually moves forward, unable to stop, growing ever longer. It must be steered left, right, up, and down to avoid hitting walls and the body of either snake. The player who survives the longest wins. A single-player version has one or more snakes controlled by the computer, as in the light cycles segment of the 1982 Tron arcade game.

In the most common single-player game, the players snake is of a certain length, so the tail also moves, and with every item "eaten" by the head of the snake the snake gets longer. Snake Byte has the snake eating apples. Nibbler has the snake eating abstract objects in a maze.

History

The Snake began with the 1976 arcade video game Blockade developed and published by Gremlin. It was cloned as Bigfoot Bonkers the same year. In 1977, Atari, Inc. released two Blockade-inspired titles: the arcade game Dominos and Atari VCS game Surround. Surround was one of the nine Atari VCS launch titles in the US and was sold by Sears under the name Chase. That same year, a similar game was launched for the Bally Astrocade as Checkmate.

The first known home computer version, which is titled Worm, was programmed in 1978 by Peter Trefonas for the TRS-80 and published by CLOAD magazine in the same year. This was followed shortly afterwards with versions from the same author for the Commodore PET and Apple II. A clone of the Hustle arcade game, itself a clone of Blockade, was written by Peter Trefonas in 1979 and published by CLOAD. An authorized version of Hustle was published by Milton Bradley for the TI-99/4A in 1980. The single-player Snake Byte was published in 1982 for Atari 8-bit computers, Apple II, and VIC-20; a snake eats apples to complete a level, growing longer in the process. In Snake for the BBC Micro (1982), by Dave Bresnen, the snake is controlled using the left and right arrow keys relative to the direction it is heading in. The snake increases in speed as it gets longer, and there is only one life.

Nibbler (1982) is a single-player arcade game where the snake fits tightly into a maze, and the gameplay is faster than most snake designs. Another single-player version is part of the 1982 Tron arcade game, themed with light cycles. It reinvigorated the snake concept, and many subsequent games borrowed the light cycle theme.

Starting in 1991, Nibbles was included with MS-DOS for a period of time as a QBasic sample program. In 1992, Rattler Race was released as part of the second Microsoft Entertainment Pack. It adds enemy snakes to the familiar apple-eating gameplay.

Later versions
Serpent (1990) is a snake game for the Game Boy.

Meerca Chase is a snake game available on Neopets.

Slither.io (2016) is a multiplayer interpretation of Snake.

In 2017, Google released a version of the game as an easter egg, whenever the phrases "snake", "play snake", "snake game" and "snake video game" are typed.

Nokia phones

Nokia puts Snake on the majority of their phones:
Snake – The first published by Nokia, for monochrome phones. It was programmed in 1997 by Taneli Armanto of Nokia and introduced on the Nokia 6110.
Snake II – Included on monochrome phones such as the Nokia 3310 from 2000.
Snake Xenzia – Included on later-model monochrome phones (and most cheaper colour phones, such as the Series 30 and Series 30+ budget mobile devices).
Snake EX – Included on colour phones. First introduced with the Nokia 9290 Communicator in 2002. It supports multiplayer through Bluetooth and Infra-Red.
Snake EX2 – Introduced with the Nokia 3100 in 2003 and included in several Series 40 handsets.
Snakes – A 3D version designed for the N-Gage in 2005. It featured multiplayer through Bluetooth. Later Nokia started preinstalling it (without multiplayer) on some Nseries smartphones like N70, N73, N80, etc. It can be downloaded from Nokia support pages and played on any S60 device.
Snake III – A 3D version, different from Snakes. Snake III takes a more living snake approach, rather than the abstract feel of Snakes. An example of a phone with it installed is the Nokia 3250 from 2005, and it supports multiplayer modes via Bluetooth.
Snakes Subsonic - Sequel to Snakes, released on May 22, 2008 for N-Gage 2.0.
Snake Xenzia (2017) - First released on the Nokia 3310.
Snake (2017) - Released with Facebook Messenger (2017)

Legacy
In 1996, Next Generation ranked it number 41 on their "Top 100 Games of All Time", citing the need for both quick reactions and forethought. In lieu of a title they listed it as "Snake game" in quotes.

On November 29, 2012, the Museum of Modern Art in New York City announced that the Nokia port of Snake was one of 40 games that the curators wished to add to the museum's collection in the future.

References

External links

 List of snake-like games
 Training AI to play snake game

Mobile games
Windows games
Linux games
Snake video games
TRS-80 games
Casual games
Nokia games
Video games about reptiles